Esensi (English: Essence) is a television news entertainment program formatting infotainment with celebrity news from Indonesia and abroad. It broadcasts on the Indonesian TV station BTV. The program has the motto "Semua Informasi Penting Selebriti" (English: All the Important Celebrity Information). The program offers information on celebrities, musicians and bands, music, and entertainment from Indonesia.

References 

Indonesian television news shows
Indonesian-language television shows
2023 Indonesian television series debuts
2020s Indonesian television series
BTV (Indonesia) original programming
Entertainment news shows in Indonesia